The Jesse & Jordin Live Tour was a co-headlining concert tour by Jesse McCartney and Jordin Sparks to support McCartney's third album Departure and Sparks' self-titled debut album Jordin Sparks. The tour started on August 5, 2008 and ended on August 30, 2008.

The month-long tour consisted of mostly United States venues with one Toronto date. Jordin and Jesse co-headlined every date except the Chicago and Buffalo, New York dates, where McCartney alone performed.

Set list

Tour dates

References

2008 concert tours
Co-headlining concert tours
Jordin Sparks
Jesse McCartney